The Military ranks of Montenegro are the military insignia used by the Armed Forces of Montenegro.

Current ranks

Commissioned officer ranks
The rank insignia of commissioned officers.

Other ranks
The rank insignia of non-commissioned officers and enlisted personnel.

Historic ranks

References

External links
 
 

Montenegro
Military of Montenegro